The 2009–10 season was Parma Football Club's 19th season in Serie A, having spent a year in Serie B, where they finished second the previous year. Parma enjoyed a successful league season, securing eighth position and narrowly missing out on a return to European competition for the first time since 2006–07.

Competitions

Serie A

League table

Matches

Notes
The match was originally scheduled for 31 January 2010 but was postponed due to snow.

Coppa Italia

Squad statistics

|-
|colspan="14"|Players who appeared for Parma that left the club during the season:

|}

Top scorers

Disciplinary record

References

2009-10
Italian football clubs 2009–10 season